The Pare (pronounced "Pahray") people are members of an ethnic group indigenous to the Pare Mountains of northern Tanzania, part of the Kilimanjaro Region. Historically, Pareland was also known as Vuasu (South Pare) and Vughweno (North Pare) to its inhabitants. The location lies on one of the northern routes of the historic East-African long-distance trade, connecting the hinterland with the coast of the Indian Ocean.

The people of Vuasu (Asu being the root word) are referred to as Vaasu and they speak a language known as Chasu or Athu. The people of Vughweno (Ugweno, in Swahili) are referred to as Vaghweno (Wagweno in Swahili) and they speak a language known as Kighweno (Gweno in Swahili).

Although once constituting a single, greater Vughweno area; current residents of northern Pare recognise two sub-areas based on ethnolinguistic differences: Gweno-speaking Ugweno to the north and Chasu-speaking Usangi to the south. The general interaction of the Pare people with the Ma'a (Va-ma'a) or Mbughu people (an ethnic group with Cushitic origins) has also led to one of the few genuinely mixed languages, reputedly combining Chasu (Bantu) grammar with Cushitic vocabulary (i.e. Kimbughu language).

Recent history

The Pare were the main producers of iron for which there was considerable demand from the Chaga and Maasai people, as well as other adjacent populations.  Notable Pare blacksmiths include the Shana clan (Shana, meaning blacksmith), who have maintained the tradition to this day.

The Pare are traditionally highly organised in terms of compulsory community work towards sustainable and inclusive development through a philosophy referred to as msaragambo.

The Usangi Kingdom between Ugweno to the north and Mgagao in the south was ruled by Mfumwa Sangiwa I (Mfumwa, meaning Chief or King) who died in 1923, Mfumwa Koshuma Sangiwa up to 1928, Mfumwa Sabuni and finally Mfumwa Shaban Mtengeti Sangiwa up to the abolition of traditional rule following the independence of Tanganyika.

In Ugweno, a chief or King was referred to as Mangi, the term also used by the Chaga. At the peak of its power, the Ugweno state had at its head a Mangi Mrwe (Supreme/Paramount Chief/ King) who was assisted by governing councils, ministers and district chiefs.

The Pare were also known as rainmakers, one notable exponent being Mfumwa Muhammad Kibacha Singo, a local ruler of Same who died in January 1981. In these rituals (as well as other cultural practices e.g. healing, initiation, etc.), spiritual figurines were often used that had been artistically sculptured out of clay or wood, and wrapped in either cloth and/or leather. Recent interest in such artefacts from collectors and researchers has unearthed them throughout the western world.

Pre-colonial

This region has historically received a substantial population of people from the Taita region of present-day Kenya. The Pare area was also inhabited by Cushitic groups such as the Mbugu in Ugweno who were eventually assimilated into the Pare communities. Additionally, the inhabitants reveal that migration occurred back and forth throughout the region, and the Pare people should be viewed as a part of the larger population that inhabits the entire Kilimanjaro Corridor.

Shana dynasty (pre 16th c.)

This era can be categorised as the 'age of skill' for the North Pare communities. Although little evidence remains about this era due to 'the great Shana disruption', records show that the Ugweno (or Vughonu) area was known throughout the region. It was ruled by the Shana clan for centuries and became known as the "Mountains of Mghonu", after an early notably famous Shana ruler, from whom it got its name.

It is the skill of the blacksmiths and the resulting valued iron products that made the area popular that eventually led to the influx of foreign groups. Archaeological evidence of iron smithing activities includes items collected by Hans Fuchs in the early twentieth century in North Pare, held in the ethnographic collections of the Náprstek Museum, Prague – refer to link: Iron Smithing Items.

In addition, there are remnants of a specialized irrigation system that expose hundreds of irrigation intakes and furrows that were constructed during this era. Only when the responsibility for irrigation management shifted from patrilineages to village-level committees (post-independence) were these systems negatively impacted towards near collapse.

It is the disruption of the Shana rule that led to miscommunication of history from modern-day communities and misinterpretations of the region and its inhabitants among early European adventurers and historians. In particular, when characterising the skill of the iron smiths based on post "civil war" communities.

Suya kingdom (post 16th c.)

This era can be categorised as the 'age of discipline and expansion' of the North Pare communities. The Suya overthrew the Shana and instituted a number of reforms that included a strict initiation system and 'one of the great centralized political administration systems' for indigenous communities in Tanzania. This allowed the Ugweno kingdom of northern Pare to expand and come into its own up to the 19th century.

South Pare
In South Pare, where the dry foothills and plains were populated by Cushitic-speaking peoples and small Bantu-speaking groups before the 1700s, saw an influx of immigrants from neighbouring communities that included Taita people, as well as those escaping civil war from North Pare. This region had a separate rule from the north and its own evolution of political systems.

Colonial
The Germans imposed an administrative rule over the area (1881-1919), then the British colonial era (in the area) lasted until 1963 when the chiefdom was abolished by an independent Tanganyika government.

At the beginning of the twentieth century, the population of South Pare (now known as Same District) was estimated at 22,000 comprising an ethnic group called Asu or Pare who are speakers of Chasu or the Pare language. They are patrilineal and were in several areas organized into small chiefdoms.

Independence movement 
The Pare Union formed in 1946 was one of Tanzania's first ethnic-based nationalist movements to begin activism against the colonial system. Among many grievances, was the exploitation through the production of export crops, particularly Sisal and Coffee. Like many other ethnic-based political groups in Tanganyika, The Pare Union then became part of the Tanganyika African Association (TAA), which later became the Tanganyika African National Union (TANU) in 1954. This prevented groups like the Pare Union from forming into full political parties that were ethnic in orientation.

Moses Seenarine writes of the contribution of Pare women in the struggle: 'The Pare women's uprising in northwest Shambaai, Tanzania, occurred in early January 1945 and continued with demonstrations into 1946, involving thousands of women. It began in Usangi, one of the chiefdoms, when the district commissioner arrived for discussions with the local chief. A crowd of hundreds (if not thousands) of women appeared, demanding an explanation of mbiru, a system of graduated taxation. When the commissioner tried to leave without addressing the women, they became enraged and mobbed the assembled officials. Two days later, women surrounded the chief's house singing songs, and ultimately stoned officials and battled police.' The Mbiru protest by the Pare people refusing to pay the colonial tax was eventually led by Paulo Kajiru of Mamba. The Pare eventually managed to defeat this tax system and went back to the flat rate of tax in 1947. This remains as an important historical event in Tanzania.

Post-colonial
The disruption of indigenous practices based on historical knowledge during the colonisation era failed to appreciate the cultural sustainability of Pare communities. As documented in archival sources and oral histories, the alteration of post-colonial land management in the North Pare Mountains had an effect on environmental conditions. Colonial forest management and water policies were all abandoned, affecting the villages in many aspects, resulting in environmental degradation and a decrease in management capacity.  It has been argued that the symbolic meaning of cultural practices, in the management of trees for instance, was more than rooted in local beliefs but also had a wider political and economic influence, as well as dissemination of knowledge for cultural preservation.

Economy 
From the 1940s, the Parelands flourished from the growth of the coffee economy. Consequently, modern Parelands are, by Tanzanian standards, quite prosperous, as its infrastructure of roads, electricity, telephones, and piped water supply attests. The area's main produce is tea, coffee, sisal, and cinchona. Rice is grown in the swampy plains.

An older infrastructure of irrigation furrows, stone-lined terraces and sacred forests lies alongside these newer technologies and shows that the Pare landscape has been carefully managed for centuries. In 1890, for example, a German geographer praised the stone terraces of the area as being similar to European vineyards and stated that the northern Pare irrigation system was a "truly magnificent achievement for a primitive people" It has been argued that the establishment and management of the irrigation infrastructure system depended on institutions that could contribute to knowledge of the development of irrigated agriculture.

Culture/Tradition

Traditional food 

Makande is a typical dish of the Pare tribe and is popular throughout Tanzania. The dish is a stew of maize, red beans, onions, garlic, tomatoes, and chicken stock. It is usually prepared on Friday and lasts through Sunday evening, giving people more time to socialize during the weekend without worrying about cooking. The food is kept in a large clay pot on damp ground so it stays cool.

Kishumba is a traditional Pare dish of banana cooked with red beans and crushed to make a hard porridge.

Vughai is a traditional Pare dish of hard porridge prepared with banana, cassava or maize flour (or a mixture of both). It is served with vegetable, beans or meat/fish/chicken stew (or both if available). When served with meat/chicken, it is considered as a welcoming dish for guests.

Special foods are also given to women after giving birth, to aid in their quick recovery.

Traditional medicine 
Before the introduction of western medicine, there were certain diseases that were cured using traditional medicine. When Lutheran missionaries were actively introducing Christianity and western style medicine in north Pare and later in south Pare from the early 1900s, it was acknowledged: "The Pare people did not embrace the modern institutions introduced by the missionaries as readily as the Chaga. The stronger position of local healers meant that traditional medicine was never rejected as an inferior or backward tradition …”.

For children who used to suffer from Wintu (mouth sore), a fungal disease thought to come from the mother's breast, they were treated by giving them sheep's milk instead of breast milk.

Kirumu, kirutu, and kinyoka (eye infection of the newborn) may be neonatal conjunctivitis. The juice of leaves from a plant called mwore was used as a cure.

Mtoro (diarrhea) made 'the child as thin as firewood' and ash of the root of wild banana was administered orally as its medicine.

The most prominent traditional belief within the Pare community was when a baby's milk teeth grew from the upper jaw; they believed it to be a curse to the society and thus killed the baby by throwing them off a large rock with a steep slope facing down a mountain. 

Pare people are known to have a variety of medicine for all sorts of diseases, largely enabled by the fertile area with natural vegetation and an unpolluted land with few people.

Traditional appearance 

Traditionally, the Vaghonu were marked by a black streak running from the middle of the forehead to the nose. Unmarried warriors were characterised as muscular and their bodies were plastered with grease and a red clay. They had different hairstyles: fully shaven, cut at the crown, worn in a thatch hanging down their necks, and twisted into thin dreads (most common). The men carried spears and shields and wore a piece of cloth or hide that hung across their breasts.

In nearby Shighatini, missionaries managed to take a picture (in the year 1902) of the Pare men in traditional clothing; refer to link:  Pare Men Wearing Traditional Clothing.

The women wore a garment of hide fastened around their waist. They had spirals of iron wire as arm and leg ornaments. They also wore large earrings made of beads, thick necklaces of brass and iron-decorated wooden ear stretchers.

Traditional housing 
The Pare built two types of round houses: (1) They used a wooden frame to create a cone-shaped house, which was likely fastened out of ropes from tree trunks, with a pitched roof made of plant fibre stretching down to the ground. Refer to link: Round House 1 (2) The wooden frame covered with leaves is only used as a roof in this second model, but the frame is covered with cementitious soil available in the Pare Mountains to create round walls. Refer to link: Round House 2.

Sacred sites 
The origins of a clan can be traced through the location of its sacred sites. For instance, despite the Shana having migrated to other parts of Pareland, their sacred sites remain in Ugweno, signifying their place of origin. Sacred sites can be referred to as Mpungi (for lineages), Mshitu/Mtiru (for clans), and Kwa Mrigha or Kwa Kivia (for ancestors). At these sites, various tribal ceremonies, customs and/or initiation were performed.

Cultural misconception 
In Tanzania, referring to someone as "Pare" is synonymous with calling them "stingy" or "cheap". Even during Tanzania's history of economic hardship, the Pare believed in making ends meet by adopting strict budget plans, albeit having insufficient funds. Given their honest and direct nature about their economic circumstances, this has been misinterpreted and stereotyped nationally. However, culturally the Pare just strive to be open and fair, hence a lack of hypocrisy in declaring their finances as modest and incorruptible (despite the odds) is viewed as the right thing to do.

Places of interest

Usangi is a small, spread-out town 1:82 hours (by personal drive) and 2:30 hours by bus from Moshi, located in some kind of crater surrounded by a bunch of peaks that is the Northern Pare Mountains.
Ugweno is located in the North Pare Mountains about 74.2 km from Moshi.
Suji, Kilimanjaro is located approximately 150 km from Moshi. And 20 km from Makanya, a town on the main Dar es Salaam – Moshi road.
Shengena Natural Forest is part of Eastern Arch Mountain. In this forest there are ponds whose water is milky or black in colour; with multi-coloured soil that can even be goldish or pinkish in appearance.
Ndungu irrigation scheme, supplies rice to the Kilimanjaro and Tanga regions.
Lake Jipe, an inter-territorial lake between Tanzania and Kenya.
Kihurio, adjacent to Ndungu, is also known for rice cultivation.
Mamba Giti is where the S.D.A Church was founded in East Africa.
Mbaga where there is also Ibwe la vana (Ibwe, meaning stone) or mkumba vana used to kill innocent children due to wrong beliefs.
Gonja where there is a waterfall known as NDURUMO of about 400 m along the Hingilili river, Ibwe leteta, sacred forests, Gonja Lutheran hospital, Shengena forest, Bombo local market, and hiking routes (Gonja Maore – Vuje village – Shengena peak) to the highest point in the Pare Mountains.
A rock with a shape similar to a human nose in Mshihwi, known as Ikamba la fua (Nose Rock).
A rock in southern Usangi on the slopes of the hills toward the kwakoa village known as Ibwe lavyana i.e. the rock where innocent children were killed in this area.
Mkomazi National Park – it was a Game Reserve before it was upgraded to a National Park in 2006.
River Mshasha at Usangi where there is a hanging tree that produces fresh water throughout the year.
Kindoroko Mountain with a natural rainforest (forest reserve) that is home to blue monkeys and many seasonal tropical birds.
Southern region of the Pare Mountains to see the south Pare white-eye (Zosterops winifredae).
Shume, or formerly known as New Hornow (German: Neu-Hornow), is a village where the Germans positioned a sawmill during the country's colonial period. This mill was linked by a cable railway with the Usambara line to permit export to Germany around 1910.

Notable Pare & people of Pare descent

Politics

Cleopa Msuya: A former Prime Minister; Vice President; Minister of various portfolios including Finance; Industry; Finance, Economic Affairs and Planning; Industry and Trade.
Asha-Rose Mtengeti Migiro: United Nations 3rd Deputy Secretary-General.
Angellah Kairuki (Lawyer): A former Minister of State in the Prime Minister's Office (Investment). She also served as Minister of Mining; Minister in the President's Office for Public Service Management and Good Governance; Deputy Minister of Land, Housing and Human Settlement Development; and Deputy Minister in the Ministry of Justice and Constitution Affairs.
Jumanne Maghembe: A former Minister of Natural Resources and Tourism.
Sifuni Ernest Mchome (Prof): The current Permanent Secretary, Ministry of Constitutional and Legal Affairs. A former Permanent Secretary at the Ministry of Education and Vocational Training (2013 -2015).
Halima Mdee: A member of the Tanzanian Parliament.
Gray S. Mgonja: A former Permanent Secretary in the Ministry of Finance.
David Mathayo David: A member of Parliament for the Same West constituency since 2005. He also served as the Minister of Livestock and Fisheries Development.
Sophia Mjema: The current Shinyanga Regional Commissioner (RC) and the former District Commissioner (DC) for Ilala and Arusha.
Ombeni Sefue: A former Chief Secretary to the President of Tanzania; A former Permanent Representative of Tanzania to the United Nations.
Anne Malecela: A former member of Parliament for the Same East constituency (2005-2015), Deputy Minister of Education, and Regional Commissioner for the Shinyanga Region (2016).
Anna Senkoro: The late member of the Progressive Party of Tanzania-Maendeleo (PPT-Maendeleo), who became the first woman in Tanzanian history to run for president.

Academics
Damari Namdori Sefue (née Kangalu): the first Tanganyikan (now Tanzania Mainland) woman to qualify as a teacher in 1931.
Joyce Msuya: A microbiologist and environmental scientist who serves as the United Nations (UN) Assistant Secretary-General for Humanitarian Affairs and Deputy Emergency Relief Coordinator. Previously served as the deputy executive director of the United Nations Environment Programme (UNEP) at the level of assistant secretary-general.
Elitabu Keto Mshigeni (Prof): A pioneer of botany research in Tanzania. He served as Pro-Vice-Chancellor for Academic Affairs and Research at the University of Namibia, Director of UNDP's Regional Africa-wide Zero Emissions Research Initiative (ZERI) Project, and Vice Chancellor at Hubert Kairuki Memorial University.
Alfeo M. Nikundiwe (Prof): A distinguished researcher in Zoology and former Head of Department: Zoology and Wildlife Conservation at the University of Dar es Salaam. Also notably the first Principal of University College of Lands and Architectural Studies (UCLAS) in Dar es Salaam.
Flower Ezekiel Msuya (Dr): A pioneer in seaweed farming, integrated aquaculture in Tanzania, and founder and chairperson of the Zanzibar Seaweed Cluster Initiative (ZaSCI).
Godwin Mjema (Prof): Director of the Economic Research Bureau (Department of Economics) at the University of Dar es Salaam and a retired Rector of The Institute of Finance Management (IFM). Also appointed as a board chair for UTT Microfinance.
John S. Mshana (Prof). Vice Rector for Academics at Kigali Institute of Science and Technology (KIST) in Rwanda. A former Chief Administrative Officer of the University of Dar es Salaam, Principal of the University College of Lands and Architectural Studies, Director of the Institute of Production Innovation and Head of the department of Mechanical Engineering. 
Amini Aza Mturi: One of the founding fathers of archaeology in Tanzania, and in whose name the Olduvai Gorge Research Station is named after.
Yunus Daud Mgaya (Prof): Director General of the National Institute for Medical Research, and a former Executive Secretary of the Tanzanian Commission for Universities.
Abel Yamwaka Mreta (Dr): Late linguist and expert on the Chasu language and former Head of the Department of Linguistics at the University of Dar es Salaam.
Sengondo Mvungi (Dr): A famous lawyer from Kisangara Juu Village. He served as a member of the Constitutional Review Commission (CRC); Advocate of the High Court and Court of Appeal of Tanzania; Dean of the Faculty of Law and lecturer at the University of Dar es Salaam; Deputy Vice Chancellor – University of Bagamoyo; member of the NCCR-Mageuzi and their presidential candidate in the December 2005 election.
Robert Nathaniel Mcharo Mshana (Dr): The Robert N Mshana Memorial Award has been named after him. A specialist in mycobacterial immunology who worked in Ethiopia, Gabon and Côte d'Ivoire; developed policies and guidelines on behalf of the OAU/STRC in Lagos, Nigeria; contributed to WHO/TDR's R&D activities; served on the Steering Committees for Immunology of Leprosy (IMMLEP), Immunology of Mycobacterial Infections (IMMYC) and Vaccine Discovery Research (VDR).
Venance Fupi (Dr): A former Chief Government Chemist (Tanzania) from Kisangara Juu Village.
Mary Mgonja (Dr): A Tanzanian agricultural scientist and plant breeder that has represented Tanzania in SADC, EAC and AGRA. She currently serves as the director of technology and communication at Namburi Agricultural Company Limited, a private Tanzanian agricultural enterprise.

Police/Army

Ben Msuya (Major General): Led the 19th battalion in 1979 (as a Lieutenant Colonel). It was the invasion forces that led to the fall of Kampala and the collapse of the Idi Amin government.
Peter Orgenes (Major): Head of engineers during the 1979 war, which resulted in the fall of Idi Amin's government.
Elangwa N. Shaidi: The first Tanzanian Inspector General of Police (IGP) 1964–1970.
Philemon Mgaya: The fourth IGP in Tanzania 1975–1980. He also served as Senior Superintendent of Police (SSP) and Dodoma Regional Police Commander (RPC) in the early 1960s and served until the mid-1960s.
Ahmed Msangi: The deputy director of criminal investigation in Zanzibar. A former Regional Police Commander (RPC) in Mbeya and Mwanza, a police spokesperson and Deputy Commissioner of Police (DCP).
Uzia Makange (Major): A former advisor of Military Affairs to President Yoweri Museveni.

Entertainment
Vanessa Morgan: A Canadian actress known for her roles in Finding Carter, The Latest Buzz, My Babysitter's a Vampire and Riverdale.
Vanessa Mdee: Singer, songwriter, rapper, youth activist, television personality and radio host. She is popularly known for being the first Tanzanian MTV VJ.
Nandy: Singer and songwriter. She won the All Africa Music Awards in the category of the best female artist in East Africa for 2017.
Ekwa Msangi: Tanzanian American director and screenwriter known for the American drama film that premiered at the Sundance Film Festival, Farewell Amor.
Mimi Mars: TV host, MC and singer-songwriter.
Raymond Mshana: Media creative (TV and radio), voice over artist and TV copywriter.
Roma Mkatoliki: Rapper, songwriter and activist.
Adam Mchomvu: Radio presenter, brand manager, hip hop artist and songwriter.

Business
Benedict Mberesero: Established one of the oldest and known bus companies in Tanzania, Ngorika Bus Transport Company Limited, trucking as well as land/property investments.
Erasto Msuya: The late gemstone dealer (notably, in Tanzanite) with high-end properties in Moshi and Arusha, who was famously assassinated.
Ridhuan A. Mringo (Eng): Board Chairman of Mwanga Hakika Bank and CEO & Managing Director of Derm Group.

Notable personalities

Paulo Kajiru Mashambo: Leader of the historical Pare pre-independence protest to repeal the mbiru (graduated tax rate) system in the 1940s.
Jumanne Mhero Ngoma: The person who discovered the gemstone named Tanzanite in northern Tanzania.
Togolani Edriss Mavura: Tanzania's ambassador to South Korea. A former Private Secretary to the Minister of Foreign Affairs, Assistant Secretary to Former President Jakaya Mrisho Kikwete.
Zuhura Yunus: The current Tanzanian Director of Presidential Communications. A former presenter and producer of BBC Swahili Service.
Gerald B. Mturi: Executive Secretary of the Tanzanian Chamber of Minerals and Energy (TCME).
January Msoffe (Judge): He served as a Justice of the Court of Appeal of Tanzania; Judge of the High Court of Tanzania; and Judge in Charge of the Dodoma High Court in Tanzania.
Brenda Msangi: Chief Executive Officer of Comprehensive Community Based Rehabilitation Tanzania (CCBRT).
Esther Mkwizu: A former chairperson of the Tanzania Private Sector Foundation (TPSF).
Elly Elikunda Mtango: A former Ambassador and Dean of the African Diplomatic Corps in Japan.
Chiefs: Mfumwa Heriel Makange (Chome); Mfumwa Kibacha Singo (Same); Mfumwa Sabuni Naguvu (Usangi); Mfumwa Mtengeti (Usangi); Mfumwa Mbwana Yateri (Gonja); Mfumwa Daudi Sekimanga Manento (Mamba); Mfumwa Yusufu Mapombe (Mbaga); Mfumwa Chauka Saidi Sadi (Hedaru); Mfumwa Rubeni Shazia (Suji); Mangi Minja Kukome (Ugweno, south); and Mangi Abdallah Sereki (Ugweno, north).

See also
Pare language
Pare Mountains
Lake Jipe
Peopling of the Kilimanjaro Corridor
Kilimanjaro Region
Battle of Kilimanjaro
Mount Kilimanjaro
Chaga people

References

Other sources
 
 
 
 
 

Ethnic groups in Tanzania
Indigenous peoples of East Africa
People from Kilimanjaro Region